Lisa Raymond and Rennae Stubbs were the defending champions, but did not compete this year.

Martina Hingis and Anna Kournikova won the title by defeating Kimberly Po and Anne-Gaëlle Sidot 6–3, 6–4 in the final.

Seeds

Draws

Draw

External links
 Official results archive (ITF)
 Official results archive (WTA)

Zurich Open
Swisscom Challenge